Black Rain were an American electro-industrial group based out of New York City. It was formed in 1992 by musicians Stuart Argabright, Chaz Cardoza, Thom Furtado and Shinichi Shimokawa. They released two studio albums on Fifth Colvmn Records: 1.0 (1995), Nanarchy (1996). The band released their third album Dark Pool on Blackest Ever Black in 2014.

History
Black Rain was formed in New York City by musicians Stuart Argabright, Chaz Cardoza, Thom Furtado and Shinichi Shimokawa. Black Rain released their debut full-length studio album 1.0 on Fifth Colvmn Records in 1995. The following year they released their second album Nanarchy on Fifth Colvmn. In 2014 the band's third album Dark Pool was released by Blackest Ever Black.

Discography
Studio albums
 1.0 (1995, Fifth Colvmn)
 Nanarchy (1996, Fifth Colvmn)
 Dark Pool (2014, Blackest Ever Black)

Extended plays
 Black Rain (1992, Kombinat)
 Black Rain (1993, TPOS)
 Protoplasm (2013, Blackest Ever Black)
 Computer Soul (2019, Blackest Ever Black)

Split releases
 Apophis (2015, Cosmo Rhythmatic)
 Rebellion Is Over (2015, Heartworm Press)

Compilation albums
 Now I'm Just a Number: Soundtracks 1994-95 (2012, Blackest Ever Black)
 Metal Rain 1989-93 (2018, DKA)

Compilation appearances
 Johnny Mnemonic (Music From the Motion Picture) (1995, Sony)
 Forced Cranial Removal (1995 Fifth Colvmn)
 Colloquium ¹ (1995, Dark Star/Eisenberg)
 Echo (1996, Full Contact)
 World War Underground (1996, Fifth Colvmn)
 Fade to Black Volume 2 (1999, K-Town)
 100% Black Octavo Volumen (2005, Blanco Y Negro)
 After the Affair: Selected Blackest Ever Black, 2012 (2012, Blackest Ever Black)
 14 Tracks: Consensual Hallucination (2012, Boomkat)
 14 Tracks: Night Derive (2014, Boomkat)
 Mind the Gap #117 (2015, Gonzo Circus)
 When You Look on the Bright Side, I Will Sit With You in the Dark (2018, Alvaret Tape)
 Delicacy Spectrum (2020, Eyemyth)

References

External links 
 
 Black Rain at Bandcamp
 
 
 
 

Musical groups established in 1992
1992 disestablishments in New York (state)
Musical groups from New York (state)
American ambient music groups
American electronic music groups
American industrial music groups
American techno music groups
Fifth Colvmn Records artists